Haridas Niranjani (Hindi हरिदास निरंजनी) was an Indian saint poet believed to have lived from the mid-sixteenth to the early seventeenth century.  

Hagiographies in Brajbhasha (a literary dialect of Hindi) report that Haridas was a native of Kapadod village near the town of Didwana in modern-day Rajasthan.  Some hagiographical sources suggest that he was a dacoit before being converted to the worship of nirguṇ rām by a holy man (sometimes identified as the yogi Gorakhnath). Haridas is recognized as the founder of the Niranjani Sampraday, a bhakti religious community primarily based in central Rajasthan. Most of Haridas's poetic compositions are in the form of hymns (pad) and diptyches (sākhī), but he also composed several longer works in various meters.

References

16th-century Indian poets
Indian male poets
People from Nagaur district
Poets from Rajasthan